Usagi Yojimbo Roleplaying Game is a role-playing game by Greg Stolze using the Fuzion game engine, published by Gold Rush Games in 1997.

Contents
Usagi Yojimbo Roleplaying Game is based on the Usagi Yojimbo comic book.

Publication history
Shannon Appelcline commented that, aside from Hero Games, "Old company friend Gold Rush Games was another early publisher of licensed Fuzion games, beginning with Usagi Yojimbo (1997), based on the comic book adventures of a samurai rabbit."

Reception
The reviewer from Pyramid #30 (March/April, 1998) stated that "Although the characters appear cartoonish, many of the stories are quite serious, and the violence in the comic book is sometimes graphic. Players of the RPG can mix-and-match seriousness and humor in their games as desired; the game definitely supports both."

Reviews
Dragon #252 (October 1998)

References

Fantasy role-playing games
Fantasy role-playing games based on anime and manga
Furry role-playing games
Historical role-playing games
Martial arts role-playing games
Role-playing games based on comics
Role-playing games introduced in 1997
Usagi Yojimbo